Chaetobroscus is a genus of beetles in the family Carabidae, containing the following species:

 Chaetobroscus anomalus Chaudoir, 1878
 Chaetobroscus kezukai Dostal, 1984
 Chaetobroscus bhutanensis Morvan, 1980

References

Broscinae
Carabidae genera